The list includes the city, country, the codes of the International Air Transport Association (IATA airport code) and the International Civil Aviation Organization (ICAO airport code), and the airport's name, with the airline's hubs marked.

Destinations
Syrian Air operates the following services (as of January 2023):

References

Lists of airline destinations